Jaanika Borislavivna Merilo (born Jaanika Mihhalevitš) is a Ukrainian-Estonian reformer,  IT innovator, philanthropist. and published author.

Since October 2019, she has been a advisor to Deputy Prime Minister of Ukraine and Minister of Digital Transformation Mykhaylo Fedorov. She served as advisor to two Ministers of Infrastructure of Ukraine, Mayor of Dnipro and Mayor of Lviv, as well as a regional manager of ELEKS Nordics, expert in Ukrainian State Agency of E-Government and founder of charity programs BookAngel and SoundAngel and is a co-founder of NGO Herojam Slava. Since March 2023 Jaanika is Special Adviser to Ministry of Social Affairs of Estonia in regards to innovation and international co-operation.

Early life 
Jaanika was born on November 16, 1979 in Tartu, Estonia to Ukrainian artist Boryslav Mikhalevich from Kamianets-Podilskyi and Estonian professor Heinike Heinsoo, a native of Tartu and Associate Professor of Baltic-Finnic Languages at the University of Tartu. In 1997, Jaanika finished from Miina Härma Secondary School, studied in EBS and in 2015 completed the MBA program of the University of Cumbria. and in Masters program of E-health Management (cum laude) of Rome Business School in 2022.

Jaanika Merilo started her career as a programmer for Olivetti and founded her own IT company, whose clients were Finnish business magazine Arvopaperi, Finnish Nokia and multinational Microsoft. In 2000 she started as Chief Innovation Officer and developing markets analyst of Arvopaperi. Merilo has still afterwards worked as a writer and columnist for Arvopaperi. In 2004 Merilo started as an invest manager at Martinson Trigon Venture Partners and was founding Estonian Investor Association and Estonian Development Fund. From 2008 to 2012 she managed the direct investments of Estonian entrepreneur Urmas Sõõrumaa mainly in Russia and Ukraine.

Career 
From January 5, 2015 to April 2015, she was an advisor to Minister of Economics and Trade Aivaras Abromavicius. Since June 15, 2015, she serves as an advisor to Mayor of Lviv. From May 12, 2016 to May 2019 served as an advisor to Minister of Infrastructure and Transportation Volodymyr Omelyan and since October 2019 to following Minister Vladyslav Kryklii. From October 2016 to April 2019, she served as advisor to Mayor of Dnipro Borys Filatov.

In May, he became advisor to Head of Ukrainian Customs Authority Maksym Nefyodov and in July 2019, coordinator of eHealth of Office of President of Ukraine Volodymyr Zelensky. Since October 2019 advisor to Deputy Prime Minister and Minister of Digital Transformation Mykhaylo Fedorov. 

Since January 2022, she has been Global Head of PR and Communications in global investment and trading marketplace Funderbeam while continuing to be advisor to Minister Fedorov.

Since March 2023, Jaaniks is the Special Adviser of Ministry of Social Affairs of Estonia on innovation and international co-operation.

Personal life 
She is married and the mother of a son. Besides Estonian and Ukrainian, Merilo is fluent in Russian, English, Finnish, and to a certain extent, French and Spanish. Merilo recently published a biography about reforms in Ukraine "I'm from Jaanika" after publishing well-received by critics poems collection "Out of Rhythm" in 2008. In 2021 she published book about Ukraine in popular travel book series by Petrone Print "Minu Ukraina".

Awards 

 2015 -  nominated In Top 12 most outstanding Estonian woman in the world" by Estonian Word.
 2015  - nominated by Google and Financial Times in NE 100 as "one of the innovators that change the world".
 2015, 2016, 2017 and 2018 in TOP 100 "Most Influential Woman" by Focus magazine (2015 — 66, 2016 — 54, 2017 — 59 and 2018 — 57)
 2017-  Nominated in «50 Business Ladies» in «IT and telecom» 
 2016 and 2017 - Gold Prize in «Personal impact in development of startups and investment» by PaySpace Magazine Awards
 2016 - Reformer of the Week by Kyiv Post 
 2016 - Nominated by Forbes and "example of best lobbyist of modern times" 
 2019 -  Top 50 "Most Influential Business Ladies" by Correspondent magazine.
 2019 - Top 25 "Fintech Managers of Independent Ukraine" 
 2020 - Top 50 "Most Influential Woman in Ukraine" by Correspondent magazine. 
 2021 - Top 50 Most Influential Woman in Ukraine" by Correspondent magazine. 
 2021 - Top 50 "Most influential Woman in fintech" by USAID and EFSE Development Facility

References 

1979 births
Living people
Politicians from Tartu
21st-century Ukrainian women politicians
Ukrainian people of Estonian descent